Gijsbert Johan ("Gijs") van der Leden (born May 11, 1967 in Gouda) is a retired water polo player from the Netherlands, who finished in ninth place with the Dutch team at the 1992 Summer Olympics in Barcelona.

References

1967 births
Living people
Dutch male water polo players
Olympic water polo players of the Netherlands
Water polo players at the 1992 Summer Olympics
Sportspeople from Gouda, South Holland
20th-century Dutch people